Oberbergkirchen is a municipality  in the district of Mühldorf in Bavaria in Germany.

References

External links
 Information about Oberbergkirchen

Mühldorf (district)